Jassem Al-Hamdan (born October 9, 1986) is a Saudi Arabian footballer who plays as a forward for Al-Nairyah.

Honours
Al-Nahda
Second Division: 2010–11
First Division runner-up: 2012–13

Al-Khaleej 
First Division: 2021–22

References

External links 
 

1986 births
Living people
Saudi Arabian footballers
Al-Rawdhah Club players
Al-Nahda Club (Saudi Arabia) players
Hajer FC players
Al Jeel Club players
Khaleej FC players
Al-Nairyah Club players
Saudi First Division League players
Saudi Professional League players
Saudi Second Division players
Saudi Fourth Division players
Association football forwards